Le Teil is a commune in the Ardèche department in southern France. The writer Romain Roussel (1898–1973) winner of the Prix Interallié in 1937 was born in Le Teil.

Population

Geography
An earthquake damaged numerous buildings and injured four people in 2019.

See also
Communes of the Ardèche department

References

Communes of Ardèche
Ardèche communes articles needing translation from French Wikipedia